Larkin is a surname of English, Irish and Russian origin (Russian: Ларкин, Ларькин, Ларкина, Ларькина). 
In England, the name is a relationship name from Lar, a pet form of the personal name Laurence. In Ireland, the name means a descendant of Lorcain or Lorcan, originally found in the form O'Lorcain.

People with the surname Larkin 
 Anatoly Larkin (1932–2005), Russian physicist, worked at Landau Institute for Theoretical Physics and was a professor at the University of Minnesota
 Austin Larkin (born 1995), American football player
 Barry Larkin (born 1964), American baseball player
 Bruce Larkin, children's book author and poet
 Byron Larkin (born 1965), American basketball player and sportscaster; brother of Barry and Stephen Larkin
 Celia Larkin, Irish civil servant and politician
 Chris Larkin, British actor
 Christopher Larkin (disambiguation), several people
 Clarence Larkin, early 20thC US author
 Claude A. Larkin (1891–1969), American Marine general
 Colin Larkin, British writer
 Denis Larkin (1908–1987), Irish politician
 Diarmuid Larkin (1918–1989), Irish artist and art educationist
 Dylan Larkin (born 1996), American ice hockey player
 Edward Larkin (disambiguation), several people
 Frank Larkin, disability rights activist
 Frankie Larkin, Glasgow Galaxy baseball player (2022-present)
 Gene Larkin, American baseball player
 Geri Larkin - Zen teacher
 Henry Larkin (1860–1942), American baseball player
 James Larkin (disambiguation), several people
 Jill H. Larkin (born 1943), American cognitive scientist
 Joan Larkin, American poet and playwright
 Joan Marie Larkin, better known as Joan Jett (born 1958), American musician
 John Larkin (disambiguation), several people
 Linda Larkin, American actress
 Lorenz Larkin, American professional mixed martial artist
 Maeve Larkin, English actor and playwright
 Margaret Larkin, American writer and musician
 Matthew Larkin, Australian rules footballer who played for the North Melbourne Football Club.
 Moscelyne Larkin, Native American ballerina, one of the "Five Moons"
 Olga I. Larkina, Russian journalist, publicist and writer
 Oliver Waterman Larkin (1896–1970), American art historian
 Patrick Larkin (hurler) (1866–1917), Irish hurler
 Patrick Larkin (novelist), American novelist
 Patrick Joseph Larkin (1829–1900), ship's captain, businessman and politician
 Patty Larkin, American Folk musician
 Peter Charles Larkin, Canadian businessman
 Phil Larkin, Irish hurling player
 Philip Arthur Larkin (1922–1985), English poet
 Ryan Larkin, Canadian animator
 Seán Larkin (born 1949), Irish art curator and art educationist
 Shane Larkin (born 1992), American basketball player; son of Barry Larkin
 Shannon Larkin (born 1967), American musician, best known as a drummer
 Sophie Larkin (1833–1903), English actress
 Stephen Larkin (born 1973), American baseball player; brother of Barry and Byron Larkin
 Steve Larkin (1910–1969), American baseball player
 Thomas Larkin (disambiguation), several people
 Tim Larkin, American video game composer and sound designer
 Tony Larkin, English professional footballer
 William Larkin (disambiguation)

People with given name Larkin
 Larkin Grimm (born 1981), an American singer-songwriter and musician

Fictional characters
 Link Larkin, a lead character in the musical Hairspray 
 Pop Larkin, Ma Larkin, and the Larkin family — characters in H. E. Bates' novel The Darling Buds of May and its sequels and television adaptation
 Theresa Russo (née Larkin), a character from Wizards of Waverly Place, and her parental family
 Maryellen Larkin, a character from the American Girl series of toys and books.
 Bryce Larkin, a character in the TV show Chuck
 Vince Larkin, a US Marshal played by John Cusack in the Movie Con Air

References

See also
Larkins (disambiguation)

Surnames of English origin
Surnames of Irish origin
Surnames of Russian origin